Vera Ignatieva-Kirova (1875–1972) was a Bulgarian drama artist, and actress. She was also the spouse of Geno Kirov.

Biography 
Vera Ignatieva was born on April 15, 1875 in Istanbul, Ottoman Empire. She graduated in the pedagogic high-school in Plovdiv. She later became a teacher in Pazardzhik. From 1895 until 1898 she studied dramatic art in the conservatory in Vienna. In 1898 she returned to Bulgaria and makes her acting debut in "Salza i Smyah" as the role of Maria Zhana in "Maria Zhana".

Vera Ignatieva specialized in Paris, Berlin, Vienna, and Moscow. She played in the Tear and Laughter "Salza i Smyah" troupe at the National Theater in Sofia from 1904 to 1923.

She is known as one of the first Bulgarian female actresses with a formal professional education.

She died on December 13, 1972 in Sofia, Bulgaria.

Major Theater Roles 

 Lyuba in "Ludetina" of Victor Krilov
 Dorina in "Tartuffe" of Jean Baptiste Molier
 Luisa in "Intrigue and Love" of Friedrich Schiller
 Rosina in "The Barber of Seville" "of Pierre-Augustin Caron de Beaumarchais

Major Film roles 

 "Pod Igoto" (1952)
 "Parva Tochka" (1956)

References 

1875 births
1972 deaths
Bulgarian actresses
Emigrants from the Ottoman Empire to Bulgaria